August 2013 Sardasht clash was a military confrontation on August 22 between Iranian security forces belonging to the Basij, the paramilitary branch of the Islamic Revolutionary Guard Corps (IRGC) and Kurdistan Free Life Party (PJAK) militants. The event is a part of the Iran-PJAK conflict, lasting from 2004, and despite the cease-fire of September 2011, producing more violence. Since the cease-fire in September 2011, when Iran declared to have destroyed the PJAK (claiming the "PJAK issue is over"), several more armed confrontations followed including December 2011 clash in Baneh, April 2012 battle, May 2013 clashes and this most recent Sardasht incident.

Iranian sources didn't specifically report of the August 22 event, however on August 26, a statement was issued by IRGC representative on Fars News that "Twelve terrorist groups have been neutralized in Iran from March 20, 2013 until today...". He also added that IRGC closely supervises the movements of PJAK groups, adding that Iran's western regions are secured.

See also
Iranian Kurdistan
West Azerbaijan

References

2013 in Iran
Sardasht clash, August 2013
Sardasht clash, August 2013
Iran–PJAK conflict
August 2013 events in Iran
Sardasht clash, August 2013